Sadaaki Konishi (January 19, 1916 – April 30, 1949) was a Lieutenant in the Imperial Japanese Army during World War II.

Biography 

Konishi was a Lieutenant in the IJA, and was the second-in-command over an internment camp at the University of the Philippines at Los Baños in Laguna Province, Philippines. 

He was cruel to the prisoners interned there, whom he deliberately starved. Konishi would withhold salt in order to give cramps to the internees, and cut off the food rations for all of the people who were held there as prisoners. He went so far as to dump a truck load of fruit on the asphalt behind the camp, telling the prisoners that if they wanted any food, they would have to go to the ground and eat it. But in the extreme  heat, the fruit rotted in the pile, and it was well beyond scavenging. This was because of his racism, as one internee told US interviewers that he called himself the "strongest white race hater in the army". 

On February 23, 1945, units of the U.S. 11th Airborne Division, the 503d Infantry Regiment (United States) and the Filipino guerillas attacked the camp, trying to liberate most of the prisoners. Most of the prisoners were extricated, but Konishi escaped. He returned a few days later with a force of men, but by then the camp was empty. The Japanese massacred some 1,500 men, women, and children in adjacent towns which they suspected of collaborating with the liberators. Konishi later admitted that he helped plan this massacre. After the war, he was tried for and convicted of war crimes by an American military tribunal in the Philippines. He was extradited to Japan, where he was hanged in 1949.

References

Bibliography
Detailed narratives, from documents, about his conduct as commander in Los Baños, his trial, his incarceration and execution, and the misinformation about his fate are available in Henderson, Bruce, 2015, Rescue at Los Baños: the most daring prison camp raid of World War II, New York: William Morrow, HarperCollins, 2015. . .

Further reading
 Arthur, Anthony, Deliverance at Los Baños, Thomas Dunne/St. Martin’s, 1985. 
 Flanagan, Edward, The Los Baños Raid: the 11th Airborne jumps at dawn, Presidio, 1986. 
 Holm, Jeremy C., When Angels Fall: From Toccoa to Tokyo, the 511th Parachute Infantry Regiment in World War II, Amazon, 2019. 
 Rottman, G.L., The Los Baños Prison Camp Raid, Oxford: Osprey, 2010. 

1916 births
1949 deaths
Imperial Japanese Army personnel of World War II
Japanese people executed for war crimes
World War II prisoners of war held by the United States
People executed by the United States military by hanging